{{DISPLAYTITLE:C18H19NO3}}
The molecular formula C18H19NO3 (molar mass: 297.35 g/mol, exact mass: 297.1365 u) may refer to:

 Oripavine, an opiate
 Codeinone

Molecular formulas